Ana Belén Álvaro Bascuñana (born April 24, 1969) is a former Spanish basketball player, representing Spain from 1988 to 2002 and winning a gold medal at the 1993 European Championship. At club level, she won the 1993 FIBA European Champions Cup and 6 Liga Femenina titles.

Club career 
After playing in her childhood club at Mollet del Vallès, she went to Hospitalet to play for Mecalux in 1984, thus making her debut in Liga Femenina at 15. After Mecalux resigned its position in the top tier, she played for Natural Cusí in nearby El Masnou, where she spent two seasons. As one of the most promising young players of her time, she got transferred to the Caja Toledo - BEX Banco Exterior project, with other young Spanish prospects in order to prepare for the 1992 Summer Olympics. After the Olympic tournament, she won back-to-back leagues with Dorna Godella and Pool Getafe. With Dorna Godella she went to win the 1992-93 FIBA European Champions Cup. She had another successful spell at French club Union Sportive Valenciennes Olympic, where she won one French league, one French cup and became runner-up of the 2000-2001 Euroleague.

National team 
She made her debut with Spain women's national basketball team at the age of 19. She played with the senior team for 14 years, from 1988 to 2002, with a total of 204 caps and 8.5 PPG. She participated in the 1992 Barcelona Olympics, 2 World Championships and in three European Championships:
 9th 1985 FIBA Europe Under-16 Championship for Women (youth)
 12th 1986 FIBA Europe Under-18 Championship for Women (youth)
 6th 1988 FIBA Europe Under-18 Championship for Women (youth)
 5th 1989 FIBA Under-19 World Championship for Women (youth)
 5th 1992 Summer Olympics
  1993 Eurobasket
 8th 1994 World Championship
 9th 1995 Eurobasket
 5th 1997 Eurobasket
 5th 1998 World Championship

Coaching career 
She became assistant coach in the French club St. Amaund Leseau in 2003. Back in Spain she continued her coaching career in clubs of the Valencian Community, including her old club Dorna Godella (renamed Ros Casares) and other male and female clubs.

References 

1969 births
Living people
Spanish women's basketball players
Olympic basketball players of Spain
Basketball players at the 1992 Summer Olympics
Point guards